is a Japanese footballer currently playing as a midfielder for Yokohama FC as a designated special player.

Career statistics

Club
.

Notes

References

External links

2001 births
Living people
Association football people from Aichi Prefecture
Nihon University alumni
Japanese footballers
Association football midfielders
Yokohama FC players